Trumansburg Creek is a river located in Seneca, Schuyler, and Tompkins counties in New York. It flows into Cayuga Lake by Trumansburg, New York.

References

Rivers of Seneca County, New York
Rivers of New York (state)
Rivers of Tompkins County, New York
Rivers of Schuyler County, New York